The Chauncey Hall House, also known as Knight House, is located in Racine, Wisconsin, United States. It was added to the National Register of Historic Places in 1976.

Designed by architect Andrew Jackson Downing, it is a two-story red brick house, built before 1854, perhaps as early as 1842, and is the oldest Gothic Revival-style house in Racine.

See also
Chauncey Hall Building, also NRHP-listed in Racine

References

Buildings and structures in Racine, Wisconsin
Gothic Revival architecture in Wisconsin
Houses in Racine County, Wisconsin
Houses on the National Register of Historic Places in Wisconsin
National Register of Historic Places in Racine County, Wisconsin